Enough Is Enough may refer to:

Music
 Enough Is Enough (Big Lean album), 2015
 Enough Is Enough (Billy Squier album), 1986
 "Enough Is Enough" (April Wine song), 1982
 "Enough Is Enough", a 1981 song by Status Quo from the album Never Too Late
 "Enough Is Enough", a 1981 song by Toronto from the album Head On
 "Enough Is Enough (Don't Give Up On Us)", a 2011 song by Avicii released on his SoundCloud
 "Enough Is Enough" (Chumbawamba song), 1993
 "Enough Is Enough", a 1999 song by Y-Tribe featuring Elisabeth Troy
 "No More Tears (Enough Is Enough)", a 1979 duet by Donna Summer and Barbra Streisand
 "Read My Lips (Enough Is Enough)", a 1989 song by Jimmy Somerville

Organizations
 Enough is Enough (campaign), a UK left-wing political campaign founded in 2022 in response to the cost of living crisis
 Enough is Enough (Nigeria), a youth advocacy group in Nigeria
 Enough Is Enough (organization), a U.S. anti-pornography organization founded in 1992
 Enough is Enough (party), a political party in Serbia
 ¡Basta Ya! (Spanish for "Enough is Enough"), a Spanish anti-terrorism organization
 ¡Ya basta!, slogan for several Latin American insurgent groups
 Ya Basta Association, network of Italian anti-capitalist and pro-immigrants rights groups 
 Zvakwana (Shona for "Enough is Enough"), an underground movement in Zimbabwe
 Sokwanele (Ndebele for "Enough is Enough"), another name for the Zimbabwe movement

Television
 "Enough Is Enough (No More Tears)", a 2005 episode of Grey's Anatomy

Other
 Enough Is Enough (letter), a resignation letter written by Davison L. Budhoo to the IMF

See also
 Enuff Z'Nuff, an American band
 "Enough Is Never Enough", the B-side to Garbage's 2001 "Cherry Lips" single